The Archdiocese of Nueva Segovia is an archdiocese of the Catholic Church in the Philippines. It covers the province of Ilocos Sur, on the island of Luzon. The see of the archdiocese is the city of Vigan.

The archdiocese was erected in 1595 in the city of Nueva Segovia (modern-day Lal-lo, Cagayan). The see was moved in 1758 to Vigan because of its relative distance, at the request of Bishop Juan de la Fuente Yepes, during the pontificate of Benedict XIV. It became an archdiocese in 1951.

The Archdiocese features the only Archbishop's Residence in the Philippines built during the Spanish Era. It is located just beside the Vigan Cathedral.  The rear of the convent also had an access to nearby Govantes Dike, apparently a convenient exit point by sea, but it is no longer in use as the dike is no longer navigable. Both the Archbishop's Residence and the Cathedral itself remains to be one of the greatest contributions of the Order of Augustinian Recollects in the Philippines.

The Archdiocese also operates its own radio station, dzNS ("NS" meaning "New Sound" and "Nueva Segovia").  It is known for being a truly neutral radio station. It is a member of the Catholic Media Network.

The Archdiocese also operates a weekly newspaper, Timek ti Amianan (Ilocano: "Voice of the North").

History

The Diocese of Nueva Segovia was established together with Cebu and Nueva Cáceres by Pope Clement VIII on August 14, 1595, by virtue of the Papal Bull, Super Specula Militantis Ecclesia under the patronage of the Immaculate Conception. Its first bishop was Fray Miguel de Benavides, OP. The ecclesiastical jurisdiction extended to the provinces of Ilocos Norte, Ilocos Sur, Abra, La Union, Pangasinan, Cagayan, Isabela, Nueva Vizcaya, Batanes, Mountain Province and five northern towns of Tarlac.

Although Vigan was the oldest town created by the Spaniards in the north, it was not made the seat of the Diocese which was created for Northern Luzon since the preferred locale, Nueva Segovia, a city at the mouth of the Ibanag River in Cagayan, was by then already a flourishing Spanish settlement while Vigan was then only a pueblo, a town. Eventually however, the city of Nueva Segovia was gradually effaced by the floods of Rio Grande, and the seat was provisionally transferred to the nearby town of Lal-lo, Cagayan. On September 7, 1758, the seat was permanently transferred to Vigan, retaining the old name, up to the present. The transfer was made at the request of Bishop Juan de la Fuente Yepes during the Pontificate of Benedict XIV. The year 2008 marks the 250th year since the transfer.

Nueva Segovia was elevated to an archdiocese, separated from Manila on June 29, 1951, by virtue of the Papal Bull of Pope Pius XII, Quo in Philippina Republica. As the other local Churches matured, there was eventual weaning from the archdiocese. Presently, it covers the civil province of Ilocos Sur, with the Dioceses of Laoag, Bangued and Baguio, and the Vicariate of Bontoc-Lagawe as suffragans. The Most Reverend Santiago C. Sancho was the first archbishop of the newly elevated metropolitan church. Since Archbishop Sancho, there had been five other Ordinaries of Nueva Segovia – Archbishops Juan C. Sison, Jose T. Sanchez, Orlando B. Quevedo, Edmundo M. Abaya, Ernesto A. Salgado and currently, Marlo Mendoza Peralta who is 37th bishop and 7th archbishop.

The archdiocese maintains a complex of mass communications media – an AM radio station, DzNS (963 kHz) founded in 1968; a weekly newspaper, Timek ti Amianan founded in 1983; and a printing press, the Imprenta Nueva Segovia founded in 1995.

In December 2018, the Nueva Segovia Archdiocesan Archives known as Archivo Nueva Segovia (ANS) was declared a national cultural treasure by the National Archives of the Philippines becoming one of only three archives, including the National Archives and the University of Santo Tomas Archives, to be given the distinction. The archives was established in the early 1990s by Archbishop Orlando Quevedo.

Coat of arms
The sword and the book are symbols of Saint Paul, patron saint of the cathedral at Vigan. The sword was the instrument of his martyrdom, the book stands for the gospel which he preached as an apostle. The inscription Gladius Spiritus (Sword of the Spirit) is taken from his epistle to the Ephesians (6:17): "Make the helmet of salvation your own, and the sword of the Spirit, God's word." The red background stands for his burning zeal for souls and for his martyrdom.

The snaky figure in silver that traverses the bottom of the field represents the Abra river on the north bank of which is the seat of the archdiocese of Nueva Segovia.

The popular name of the seat of Nueva Segovia is Vigan which derived its name from the Ilocano word "bigaan," a contraction of 'cabigaan' meaning where the 'biga' abounds, a plant of the taro family but bigger than the taro and with bigger tubers; hence its scientific name Alocasia macrorhiza meaning an alocasia with big root.

Ordinaries

Bishops 
Miguel de Benavides, 1595–1602
Diego Soria, 1602–1613
Miguel García Serrano, 1616–1618
Juan Rentería, 1618–1626
Hernando Guerrero, 1627–1634
Diego Aduarte, 1634–1636
Fernando Montero Espinosa, 1639–1646
Rodrigo Cárdenas, 1650–1661
José Millán de Poblete, 1675, died as Bishop-elect
Francisco Pizaro de Orellana, 1680–1683
Diego de Gorospe y Irala, 1699–1715
Pedro Mejorada, 1717–1719
Jeronimo Herrera y Lopez, 1724–1742
Manuel del Rio Flores, 1744–1745
Juan de Arechederra, 1750–1751
Juan de La Fuente Yepes, 1753–1757
Bernardo de Ustariz, 1763–1764
Miguel García San Esteban, 1768–1779
Juan García Ruiz, 1784–1796
Agustín Pedro Blaquier, 1801–1803
Cayetano Pallás, 1806–1814
Francisco Albán Barreiro, 1817–1837
Rafael Masoliver, 1846–1846
Vicente Barreiro y Pérez, 1848–1856
Juan José Aragonés, 1865–1872
Mariano Cuartero y Sierra, 1874–1887
José Hevía y Campomanes, 1889–1903
Dennis Joseph Dougherty, 1903–1908
James Jordan Carroll, 1908–1912
Peter Joseph Hurth, 1913–1926
Santiago Caragnan Sancho, 1927–1951, bishop until June 29, 1951

Archbishops

Suffragan Dioceses 

 Diocese of Baguio
 Diocese of Bangued
 Diocese of Laoag

Notable Churches under the jurisdiction of the Archdiocese

See also
 Catholic Church in the Philippines
 List of Catholic dioceses in the Philippines
 List of Catholic archdioceses

References

External links
http://www.newadvent.org/cathen/11149b.htm
http://www.cbcponline.org/jurisdictions/nueva_segovia.html

Nueva Segovia
Archdiocese
1595 establishments in the Philippines
Religious organizations established in the 1590s
Nueva Segovia
Vigan
Religion in Ilocos Sur